Mindungsan (Gyeonggi-do) is a mountain of South Korea. It has an elevation of 1,023 metres

See also
List of mountains of Korea

References

Mountains of Gyeonggi Province
Pocheon
Gapyeong County
Mountains of South Korea
One-thousanders of South Korea